A fourth engineer or third assistant engineer is the most Junior engine officer in the engine department of a merchant vessel.

Summary 

A third assistant engineer’s license is by a Maritime Administration in accordance with the International Convention on the Standards and Training of Watchkeepers that allows the recipient to work on board any vessel up to the rank of a fourth engineer or below. Third assistant engineers do most of the general labor among the officers, as well as leading the oilers and other engine room crew. Depending on the style of ship, company, and other factors, they are called "the third" or "the fourth," usually stand a watch and sometimes assist the third mate in maintaining proper operation of the lifeboats. 

This credential, is earned by cadets who complete engineering training at an authorised maritime academy. 

American 3rd assistant engineers can receive an optional commission as ensign in the U.S. Naval Reserve, Merchant Marine Reserve, or Coast Guard Reserve. With experience and additional training, third officers may qualify for higher rank.

Duties 
The general duties for a third assistant engineer (fourth engineer) differ from ship to ship. Generally speaking, third assistant engineer (fourth engineer) are tasked with controlling the main propulsion systems, water systems,Purifiers,Air compressors,Sewage Treatment Plant,Fresh water Generator, actively involving in bunkering operation,Record keeping of fuel tanks sounding as instructed by chief engineer and anything else tasked to them from up in the chain of command. A third assistant engineer (fourth engineer) is part of the engine company’s chain of command. The top of this chain of command is the Chief engineer (or first engineer), who is in command of engine room and auxiliary areas that would relate. Then comes the first assistant engineer, or second engineer, second assistant engineer (third engineer, and then the third assistant engineer, or fourth engineer. These are the officers within the engine company of a standard ship.

The third assistant engineer is in charge of keeping the plant in operation, with command being passed down and being delegated by whomever is on watch. They are trained to be competent in a wide variety of fields such as HVAC (heating, ventilation, and air conditioning), electronics, hydraulics, engine room auxiliary machinery and the operation and maintenance of both steam and diesel propulsion plants. Duties will vary from ship to ship, but the Fourth Engineer is expected to handle tasks in all areas of the ship. As with all seafarers, the third assistant engineer is an integral part of the emergency response with critical technical knowledge.

Training 
The rank of third assistant engineer can be earned by one of two ways, either through training and an approved cadetship program or by advancing from a engine room rating, colloquially termed hawsepiping. Both tracks require the individual to complete specific training in order to meet the requirements set out by STCW Convention. 

Engineer officers, as with all merchant seaman, are required to complete basic safety training. This may include training in Firefighting, Damage control, First Aid, and survival.

Unions and Professional Organizations 
U.S. maritime licensed and non-licensed crew are mandated to be part of one of many of the unions. The maritime industry is a closed shop style of union. There are two primary Unions that a third assistant engineer (fourth engineer) may become associated with, the Marine Engineers' Beneficial Association and American Maritime Officers. These unions protect the maritime industry by protecting the workers and amassing the billets for maritime workers to take for jobs. Most of these billets run for 30, 60, or 90 days.

The Institute of Marine Engineering, Science and Technology is an international professional organisation that represents seagoing and shoreside Officers and Professionals in the wider Marine Engineering community.

See also

Seafarer's professions and ranks
Engine room
Engine department

Notes and references

External links

Description at WomenOceanographers.org
Job Description at WHOI
Job Description at Human Resources and Skills Development Canada
Job Description at Maritime Industry Authority Philippines

Nautical terminology
Marine occupations
Transport occupations